The Class C56 is a type of 2-6-0 steam locomotive built by the Japanese Government Railways (JGR) from 1935 to 1939, and later operated by Japanese National Railways (JNR). They were numbered C56 1-C56 164 a total of 164 were built from 1935-1939 locomotives numbered C56 1-C56 90 and C56 161-C56 164 were sent to other countries in Asia during the Second World War. The locomotives were retired in 1974. They were designed by Hideo Shima.

History
A total of 164 Class C56 locomotives were built between 1935 and 1939.

Locomotives C56 1 to 90 and 161 to 164 were sent to Asian countries occupied by Japan during World War II. The locomotives are popularly known as Shigoroku, Shigoro (C56 in Japanese) and Pony of the Plateau among railfans.

Preserved examples
A number of Class C56 locomotives are preserved in Japan and other Asian countries. C56 160 is maintained in operating condition by JR West for use on main line steam specials.
 C56 3: State Railway of Thailand. (SRT 701) Destroyed in the film in Great Friday/ตัดเหลี่ยมเพชร (in the film had the number 731)
 C56 4: State Railway of Thailand. (SRT 702) Preserved at Sai Yok Noi Waterfall, Kanchanaburi.
 C56 15: State Railway of Thailand. (SRT 713) Preserved for haul the special steam train for show in River Kwai Festival at Kanchanaburi between late November and/or early December.
 C56 16: State Railway of Thailand. (SRT 714) Preserved at Bangkok Railway Station.
 C56 17: State Railway of Thailand. (SRT 715) Preserved for haul the special steam train for show in River Kwai Festival at Kanchanaburi between late November and/or early December. (The alternate locomotive if C56 15 out of service) 
 C56 23: State Railway of Thailand. (SRT 719) Preserved at River Kwai Bridge, Kanchanaburi
 C56 31: Yūshūkan (SRT 725) Japanese military and war museum. Used in Burma and Thailand during the construction of the Death Railway and subsequently used in Thailand after the war. It was brought back to Japan in the 1970s.
 C56 36: State Railway of Thailand. (SRT 728) Preserved at Lampang Railway Station.
 C56 41: State Railway of Thailand. (SRT 733) Stored at Makkasan Depot, Bangkok.
 C56 44: (SRT 735) Preserved in operating condition on the Ōigawa Railway. On some occasions, this locomotive will be dressed as James the Red Engine to pull special Day Out with Thomas special events with C11 227 (Thomas)
 C56 47: State Railway of Thailand. (SRT 738) Preserved at Thai Film Archive, Salaya, Nakhon Pathom.
 C56 53: State Railway of Thailand. (SRT 744) Private property, near the Road 1269 in Chiang Mai
 C56 56: Burma Railway. (Burma Railway No. C-0522) Preserved at Death Railway Museum, Thanbyuzayat, Myanmar.
 C56 92: Preserved in front of Izumi Station in Kagoshima Prefecture.
 C56 94: Preserved in Nishi Park in Ōmachi, Nagano.
 C56 96: Preserved in Minamimaki, Nagano.
 C56 98: Preserved in the 19th Century Hall next to Torokko Saga Station in Kyoto.
 C56 99: Preserved at the Dacho Dream Eco Land in Satsumasendai, Kagoshima.
 C56 101: Preserved in a park in Saku, Nagano.
 C56 106: Preserved in a park in Fuchu, Hiroshima.
 C56 108: Preserved in Unnan, Shimane.
 C56 110: Preserved in a park in Soka, Saitama.
 C56 111: Preserved at an elementary school in Takarazuka, Hyōgo.
 C56 124: Preserved at a community centre in Azumino, Nagano.
 C56 126: Preserved at Kobuchizawa Elementary School in Hokuto, Yamanashi.
 C56 129: Preserved in a park in Iiyama, Nagano.
 C56 131: Preserved in Kita Park in Matsue, Shimane.
 C56 135: Preserved in a park in Kato, Hyogo. Purchased by Oigawa Railways through crowdfunding, restoration under way as of December 2022.
 C56 139: Preserved at Yokohama Hommoku Freight Terminal on the Kanagawa Rinkai Railway in Yokohama, Kanagawa.
 C56 144: Preserved at Komoro Castle in Komoro, Nagano.
 C56 149: Preserved in front of Kiyosato Station in Hokuto, Yamanashi.
 C56 150: Preserved at the Hakuba Alps Autocamp site in Hakuba, Nagano.
 C56 160: Preserved in operating condition by JR West at Kyoto Railway Museum.

See also
 Japan Railways locomotive numbering and classification

References

1067 mm gauge locomotives of Japan
Steam locomotives of Japan
2-6-0 locomotives
Hitachi locomotives
Kawasaki locomotives
Preserved steam locomotives of Japan
Railway locomotives introduced in 1935
1′C h2 locomotives
Steam locomotives of Thailand